Portland Tram may refer to:

 The Portland Aerial Tram, an aerial cableway in Portland, Oregon, USA
 The Portland Streetcar, a tramway or tram system (British English) also located in Portland, Oregon

See also
 Portland Vintage Trolley, which used vintage-style tramcars
 Railroad history of Portland, Maine#Street cars – history of trams (streetcars) in Portland, Maine